A public observatory is an astronomical observatory mainly dedicated to public and educational purposes. It is often supported by a municipality, a school or an astronomical  society.

The primary purpose of public observatories is to offer extensive programs for public education in astronomy. A second purpose may be to serve as a center for local hobby astronomers, or for interested astro-tourists. Some sites also are engaged in special research programs, e.g. on meteors or asteroids.

Public observatories are equipped with several optical telescopes that are housed within a dome or similar structure to protect the instruments from the elements. The domes have a slit in the roof that can be opened during observing and closed when the observatory is not in use. Additional equipment may include astronomical clocks, star maps, PCs, digital projectors, and educational material.

Literature
 H.Bernhard, D.Bennett, H.Rice, 1948: Handbook of the Heavens, Chapter 20-21, McGraw-Hill, New York
 Detlev Block: Astronomie als Hobby, 208 S. Bassermann, München 2006

References

 
Amateur astronomy
Observational astronomy